Botlakunta is a small village located in konijerla mandal, khammam district, Telangana, INDIA

Mandal Name : Konijerla
District : Khammam 
State : Telangana 
Region : Telangana 
Language : Telugu and English
Time zone:	IST (UTC+5:30) 
Elevation / Altitude: 107 meters. Above Sea level 
Telephone Code / Std Code:08749 
Pin Code : 507305

References

Villages in Khammam district